On the Spur of the Moment is an album by American jazz pianist Horace Parlan featuring performances recorded and released on the Blue Note label in 1961.

Reception
The Allmusic review by Stephen Thomas Erlewine awarded the album 4 stars and stated: "There are a few ballads, and even when things are at their hottest, Parlan's understated playing is a cue for the group to keep it tasteful, but that relaxed atmosphere is part of the reason why On the Spur of the Moment is another winning effort from the underrated pianist."

Track listing
All compositions by Horace Parlan except as indicated
 "On the Spur of the Moment" - 5:52
 "Skoo Chee" (Booker Ervin) - 10:55
 "And That I Am So in Love" (Harold Ousley) - 5:04
 "Al's Tune" (Ervin) - 7:02
 "Ray C." (Leon Mitchell) - 6:45
 "Pyramid" (Roger Williams) - 6:28
 "On the Spur of the Moment" [alternate take] - 7:55 Bonus track on CD reissue
 "Pyramid" [alternate take] (Williams) - 6:31 Bonus track on CD reissue
Recorded at Rudy Van Gelder Studio, Englewood Cliffs, NJ on March 18, 1961

Personnel
Horace Parlan - piano
Tommy Turrentine - trumpet
Stanley Turrentine - tenor saxophone
George Tucker - bass
Al Harewood - drums

References

Blue Note Records albums
Horace Parlan albums
1961 albums
Albums produced by Alfred Lion
Albums recorded at Van Gelder Studio